Vanderlei Eustáquio de Oliveira, often known as Palhinha (born 11 June 1950 in Belo Horizonte) is a retired Brazilian footballer who played as a forward.

Club career
Palhinha started his football career in Cruzeiro in 1969 and had played for them until 1976. In the last season that he played for Cruzeiro, he was the top scorer of Copa Libertadores and helped the club to win the trophy for the first time. In 1977, he transferred to Corinthians and played there until 1980. In 1980, he transferred to Atlético Mineiro, the main rival of his former club Cruzeiro in the state of Minas Gerais. In the following years, he transferred to various club frequently. In 1982, he played for Santos FC, while he transferred to Vasco da Gama in the same year. In 1983, he was back to Cruzeiro, but only played for the club for two years. In 1985, he played for América in the Campeonato Mineiro and then retired after that year.

International career
Palhinha represented Brazil national football team sixteen times during his peak era from 1973 to 1979, including leading the national team to the second runners-up in Copa América 1979. He scored three goals for his country in all his national team appearances.

References

External links
 

1950 births
Living people
Footballers from Belo Horizonte
Brazilian footballers
Brazilian football managers
Brazil international footballers
Campeonato Brasileiro Série A players
1975 Copa América players
1979 Copa América players
Campeonato Brasileiro Série A managers
Cruzeiro Esporte Clube players
Sport Club Corinthians Paulista players
Clube Atlético Mineiro players
Santos FC players
CR Vasco da Gama players
América Futebol Clube (MG) players
América Futebol Clube (MG) managers
Clube Atlético Mineiro managers
Rio Branco de Andradas Futebol Clube managers
Sport Club Corinthians Paulista managers
União São João Esporte Clube managers
Ferroviário Atlético Clube (CE) managers
Associação Atlética Internacional (Limeira) managers
Villa Nova Atlético Clube managers
Al-Ta'ee managers
Brazilian expatriate sportspeople in Saudi Arabia
Expatriate football managers in Saudi Arabia
Saudi Professional League managers
Association football forwards